OTMS may refer to:

 Otto Marseus van Schrieck's monogram
 Octadecyltrimethoxysilane
 Over Thirty Months Scheme a scheme to keep older cattle out of the human food chain